Swedish singer Anni-Frid Lyngstad has recorded five studio albums, six compilation albums, twenty-eight singles, and five guest singles.

On 3 September 1967, after Lyngstad won a talent contest with a prize of record contract with EMI, she appeared on the television series "Hylands hörna". The Swedish division of EMI assigned her to the record label His Master's Voice and released her debut single "En ledig dag"; the song did not chart. A year later, EMI transferred her to EMI Columbia as a part of the earlier label's reorganisation into a classical record label. Among of her singles such as "Härlig är vår jord" managed to reach the Sverigetopplistan charts and land her into the 1969 Melodifestivalen competition, but she did not reach No. 1 on the music chart until she released her single "Min egen stad" on 1971, co-written by her then-boyfriend Benny Andersson with lyricist Peter Himmelstrand.

After her contract with EMI Columbia lapsed the same year, she was signed to the roster of Stig Anderson's label Polar Records and recorded "Man vill ju leva lite dessemellan" as her debut single for Polar Records. A year later, she joined the pop supergroup Björn Benny & Agnetha Frida (later ABBA) to record their debut single "People Need Love" and later the album "Ring Ring". Lyngstad briefly continued her solo career by recording her acclaimed solo album "Frida ensam" and her accompanying single "Fernando" in Swedish. Due to her commitment to ABBA, she did not release solo albums and singles until in 1982 and 1984, with "Something's Going On" and "Shine", produced by Genesis drummer Phil Collins and record producer Steve Lillywhite respectively. Her single "I Know There's Something Going On" from her 1982 album peaked at No. 13 on the Billboard Hot 100 in the United States.

Between 1985 and 1991, she relegated her career to being a guest singer, notably with "Så länge vi har varann" by Swedish pop group Ratata. She returned to her solo career in 1991 by recording charity singles and releasing her album "Djupa andetag" in 1996. The album charted at No. 1 on Sverigetopplistan. A follow-up album to the earlier was planned but was shelved, partly due to her daughter Ann Lise-Lotte Casper's death from complications from automobile accident the following year. Since the late 1990s, Lyngstad sporadically recorded several guest singles featuring artists such as Deep Purple keyboardist Jon Lord and jazz trumpeter Arturo Sandoval. She retired from live performing and touring and has since stated as of May 2017 in a Schweizer Radio interview that she has no intention to return to live performing other than studio recordings and guest appearances.

Albums

Studio albums

Compilation albums

Box sets

Singles

English singles

A^ Released only in South Africa.
B^ Released only in Japan.
C^ Released only in France.
D^ Released only in United Kingdom.
E^ Double A-side with Swedish-language "Änglamark".

Promotional singles

Swedish singles

E^ Double A-side with English-language "Saltwater".

As featured artist

Spanish singles

Videos

References

External links
Discogs discography page of Anni-Frid Lyngstad
AllMusic page of Anni-Frid Lyngstad

Discographies of Swedish artists
Pop music discographies